The 15th African Swimming Championships were held from 20 to 24  August 2022 in Tunis, Tunisia.

Medal table

Medal summary

Men

Women

Mixed

Participating countries

References

African Swimming Championships
Swimming Championships
African Swimming Championships
African Swimming Championships
Swimming competitions in Tunisia
Sport in Tunis
August 2022 sports events in Africa